Chute is a surname, and may refer to:

 Anthony Chute (fl. 1590s–1595), Elizabethan poet and pamphleteer
 B. J. Chute (1913–1987), American writer and academic
 Carolyn Chute (born 1947), American writer and activist
 Chaloner Chute (died 1659), English lawyer and Speaker of the House of Commons
 Chaloner Chute (died 1666) (1632–1666), English lawyer and politician
 Charles Chute (1879–1956), English barrister, landowner, and politician
 Christopher G. Chute (born 1955), American biomedical informatics researcher
 Desmond Chute (1895–1962), English poet, artist and Catholic priest
 Harris H. Chute (c. 1823 – 1892), merchant and political figure in Nova Scotia
 Hillary Chute (born 1976), American academic
 Marchette Chute (1909–1994), American biographer
 Philip Chute (1506–1567), English Member of Parliament
 Trevor Chute (1816–1886), Irish army officer